Grete von Zieritz (10 March 1899 – 26 November 2001) was an Austrian-German composer and pianist.

Life
Grete von Zieritz was born in Vienna, Austria into a noble family, and grew up in Vienna, Innsbruck and Graz. She received her first piano lessons at the age of six, and later studied with Hugo Kroemer (piano) and Roderick Mojsisovics (musical composition). She gave her first concert at age eight.

In Berlin, she continued her studies with Martin Krause, a student of Franz Liszt, and Rudolf Maria Breithaupt. After the successful performance of her "Japanese Songs" in 1921, she decided to become a composer. Von Zieritz worked as a music teacher and continued to study in Berlin from 1926 to 1931 under Franz Schreker. In 1939 she was the only woman at the International Music Festival in Frankfurt am Main among composers from 18 nations. In 2009 in Vienna Donaustadt the Zieritzgasse was named after her. She died in Berlin in 2001.

Awards
1928: Mendelssohn-State Award
1928: Schubert scholarship to Columbia Phonograph Company
1978: Merit First Class for Science and the Arts
1979: Order of Merit
1982: PRS-Medal of Honour for 50-year membership
1999: Badge of Honour of the National Music Council, Berlin
1999: German Critics' Award (Special)

Works
Grete von Zieritz wrote over 250 works for various ensembles. Selected works include:

Orchestral 

 Kleine Abendmusik for string orchestra (1916)
 Triple Fugue for string orchestra (1926)
 Intermezzo diabolico (1932)
 Bilder vom Jahrmarkt for flute and orchestra (1937)
 Das Gifthorner Konzert for flute, harp, and strings (1940)
 Triple Concerto for flute, clarinet, bassoon, and orchestra (1950)
 Le violon de la mort (Danses macabres) for violin, piano, and orchestra (1956–1957)
 Divertimento for 12 solo instruments and chamber orchestra (1962)
 Sizilianische Rhapsodie for violin and orchestra (1965)
 Concerto for 2 trumpets and orchestra (1975)
 Organ Concerto (1977)
 Fanfare (1979)
 Zigeunerkonzert for violin and orchestra (1982)

Chamber 

Japanese Songs for soprano and piano (1919)
Prelude and Fugue in C minor for piano (1924)
 Sonata for viola and piano, Op. 67 (1939)
Kaleidoskop, Duo for violin and viola, Op. 127 (1969)
 Suite for viola solo, Op. 141 (1976)
Prelude and Fugue for organ (1977)
Kassandra-Rufe for eight solo instruments and nonet (1985/86)

Vocal

With orchestra 

 Passion im Urwald for soprano and orchestra with text by the composer (1930)
 Vogellieder for soprano, flute, and orchestra (1933)
 Hymne for baritone and orchestra on texts by Novalis (1943)
 Die Zigeunerin Agriffina for soprano and orchestra (1956)
 Japanische Lieder for soprano and chamber orchestra (1972)

Unaccompanied 

 Dem Zonnengott for women's chorus on texts by Hölderlin (1940)
 Berglied for mixed chorus (1962)
 4 Alt-Aztekische Gesänge for mixed chorus (1966)
 5 Portugiesisch-Spanische Gesänge for mixed chorus (1966)
 7 Gesänge for mixed chorus on texts of "contemporary black poetry" (1966)
 3 Chöre for men's chorus on texts by Fontane (1973)

References

Further reading
Aigner, Rita. (1991) Grete von Zieritz: Life and Work. Berlin. Ries & Erler.
Olivier, Antje & Karin wine Gartz-Perschel. (1988) Composers AZ. Düsseldorf. Toccata publisher for women's studies.
Stürzbecher, Ursula. (1973) Workshop Discussions with Composers. Munich. P. 130-139.
Sadie, Julie Anne & Rhian, Samuel, Ed. (1994) The Norton/Grove Dictionary of Women Composers. New York and London. Norton.

1899 births
2001 deaths
Austrian classical composers
Austrian centenarians
Women classical composers
Austrian music educators
Recipients of the Cross of the Order of Merit of the Federal Republic of Germany
20th-century women musicians
Women music educators
Women centenarians